Kucova may refer to:

 Kristína Kučová (born 1990), a Slovak tennis player
 Kuçovë, a municipality in Albania